Harriotta is a genus of cartilaginous fish in the family Rhinochimaeridae.

Some common names for species in the genus include bentnose rabbitfish, bigspine spookfish, longnose chimaera, long-nosed chimaera, longnosed chimaera, and narrownose chimaera.

Distribution
Harriotta species can be found in the deep waters of continental slopes around 380 to 2,600 m deep in the Atlantic and the Pacific Oceans. It is also known to be found in the Indian Ocean off of southern Australia. They are also common in the northern Atlantic, northwest Pacific, and southwest Pacific Oceans.

It contains these species:
 Harriotta haeckeli Karrer, 1972 (smallspine spookfish)
†Harriotta lehmani Werdelin, 1986
 Harriotta raleighana Goode & Bean, 1895 (narrownose chimaera)
 †Harriotta gosseleti (Winkler, 1880) Belgium, Oligocene (Rupelian)

See also
 List of prehistoric cartilaginous fish

References

 
Cartilaginous fish genera
Fauna of the Canary Islands
Fish of Namibia
Marine fish of Southern Australia
Marine fish of New Zealand
Taxa named by Tarleton Hoffman Bean
Taxa named by George Brown Goode
Taxonomy articles created by Polbot